Thomas Vose Daily (September 23, 1927 – May 14, 2017) was an American prelate of the Roman Catholic Church who served as bishop of the Diocese of Brooklyn in New York from 1990 to 2003.  He previously served as bishop of the Diocese of Palm Beach in Florida from 1984 to 1990 and as an auxiliary bishop of the Archdiocese of Boston in Massachusetts from 1975 to 1984

Biography

Early life
Thomas Daily was born in Belmont, Massachusetts to John F. and Mary McBride (née Vose) Daily, on September 23, 1927. He attended at Boston College and later St. John's Seminary in Boston, Massachusetts.

Priesthood 
Daily was ordained a priest of the Archdiocese of Boston on January 10, 1952, by Cardinal Richard Cushing at Boston's Cathedral of the Holy Cross. Following ordination, he was assigned as curate for St. Ann's Parish in Quincy, Massachusetts. He remained in that post through the rest of that decade. In 1960, Daily joined the Missionary Society of St. James the Apostle and moved to the Limatambo area of Cusco, Peru. He spent five years as a missionary in Peru.

After returning to Boston, Daily was assigned again to St. Ann's, where he served as assistant pastor until 1971. He was appointed to the position of secretary to Cardinal Humberto Medeiros and later vicar for temporalities.

Auxiliary Bishop of Boston 
On December 28, 1974, Pope Paul VI appointed Daily as an auxiliary bishop of the Archdiocese of Boston.  He was consecrated on February 11, 1975 by Cardinal Medeiros. In 1976, Daily was appointed vicar general of the archdiocese. Because of his fluency in Spanish, he was given special duties regarding the Spanish-speaking members of the archdiocese.

Bishop of Palm Beach
On July 17, 1984,  Daily was appointed by Pope John Paul II as the first bishop of the new Diocese of Palm Beach. Among his most noteworthy actions were his leading of anti-abortion prayer vigils at local women’s health clinics. From 1987 to 2005, Daily also served as the supreme chaplain of the Knights of Columbus.

Bishop of Brooklyn
On February 20, 1990, John Paul II appointed Daily as the sixth bishop of the Diocese of Brooklyn, succeeding Bishop Francis J. Mugavero. Daily was installed on April 18,m 1990.  Shortly after his installation, he responded to a reporter's question by stating that the then-Governor of New York, Mario Cuomo, would not be welcomed as a speaker in the diocese's parishes because of Cuomo's pro-choice position on abortion rights for women.

Retirement and legacy
On August 1, 2003, Daily announced his resignation as a bishop had finally been accepted by the Vatican, ten months after he had submitted a letter of resignation upon reaching the mandatory retirement age of 75.  Daily served  as a member of the Pontifical Commission for Latin America and as a board member of the Society of St. James the Apostle in Boston and the National Catholic Office for Persons with Disabilities in Washington, D.C.

Thomas Daily died on May 15, 2017 at the Bishop Mugavero Residence in Douglaston, Queens in New York City He was 89.

See also
 

 Catholic Church hierarchy
 Catholic Church in the United States
 Historical list of the Catholic bishops of the United States
 List of Catholic bishops of the United States
 Lists of patriarchs, archbishops, and bishops

References

External links
 Roman Catholic Diocese of Brooklyn Official Site

Episcopal succession

1927 births
2017 deaths
20th-century Roman Catholic bishops in the United States
21st-century Roman Catholic bishops in the United States
American Roman Catholic clergy of Irish descent
Boston College alumni
People from Belmont, Massachusetts
Roman Catholic bishops of Palm Beach
Roman Catholic bishops of Brooklyn
Saint John's Seminary (Massachusetts) alumni
Catholics from Massachusetts
People from Douglaston–Little Neck, Queens